Deniss Smirnovs (born 7 March 1999) is a Latvian professional ice hockey centre who is currently playing with Genève-Servette HC of the National League (NL).

Smirnovs played his junior hockey in Switzerland which allows him to compete in the NL and the SL with a Swiss player-license.

Playing career
On August 8, 2019, Smirnovs signed his first professional contract with Genève-Servette HC, after having played 5 seasons with the organization's junior teams.

Smirnovs made his National League debut with Genève-Servette HC on September 13, 2019 against the SCL Tigers at the Ilfis Stadium. He scored his first NL goal that day and picked up an assist to become the team's PostFinance Top Scorer for their Home Opener the next day against EHC Biel.

International play
Smirnovs made his debut with Latvia men's national team in 2018.

Personal life
Smirnovs left Latvia and moved to Geneva in 2014 at age 15 to continue his junior career.

He is fluent in both Latvian and French.

Career statistics

Regular season and playoffs

International

References

External links

1999 births
Living people
Genève-Servette HC players
EHC Kloten players
Latvian ice hockey centres
Ice hockey players at the 2022 Winter Olympics
Olympic ice hockey players of Latvia